HMCS Brandon is a  that has served in the Canadian Forces since 1999. Brandon is the eleventh ship of her class. She is the second vessel to use the name . The Brandon is assigned to Maritime Forces Pacific (MARPAC) and is homeported at CFB Esquimalt.

Design and description
The Kingston class was designed to fill the minesweeper, coastal patrol and reserve training needs of the Canadian Forces, replacing the s, s and Royal Canadian Mounted Police coastal launches in those roles. In order to perform these varied duties the Kingston-class vessels are designed to carry up to three  ISO containers with power hookups on the open deck aft in order to embark mission-specific payloads. The seven module types available for embarkation include four route survey, two mechanical minesweeping and one bottom inspection modules.

The coastal defence vessels are powered by four Jeumont ANR-53-50 alternators coupled to four Wärtsilä UD 23V12 diesel engines creating . Two LIPS Z-drive azimuth thrusters are driven by two Jeumont CI 560L motors creating  and the Z drives can be rotated 360°.

The Kingston class is equipped with a Kelvin Hughes navigational radar using the I band and a Kelvin Hughes 6000 surface search radar scanning the E and F bands. The vessels carry an AN/SQS-511 towed side scan sonar for minesweeping and a Remote-control Mine Hunting System (RMHS). The vessels are equipped with one Bofors 40 mm/60 calibre Mk 5C gun and two M2 machine guns. The 40 mm gun was declared obsolete and removed from the vessels in 2014. Some of them ended up as museum pieces and on display at naval reserve installations across Canada. The Kingston-class coastal defence vessels have a complement of 37.

Service history
Brandons keel was laid down on 6 December 1997 by Halifax Shipyards Ltd. at Halifax, Nova Scotia and was launched on 10 July 1998. The ship transferred to the west coast, arriving at CFB Esquimalt on 3 May 1999. Brandon was commissioned into the Canadian Forces on 5 June 1999 at Esquimalt, British Columbia and carries the hull number MM 710.

Brandon, accompanied by the frigates ,  and sister ship , departed in October 2014 to take part in San Francisco Fleet Week and the Task Group Exercise with the United States Navy in American coastal waters. Following those exercises, Brandon and Yellowknife deployed as part of Operation Caribbe, completing their tour on 4 December.

During their deployment, Brandon performed two seizures of smuggling vessels. The two ships returned to Canada in December. On 6 October 2016, Brandon and  left Esquimalt to participate in Operation Caribbe along the Pacific coast. On 5 November, Brandon was directed to intercept a suspected fishing vessel dumping cargo into the water by a United States Coast Guard aircraft. The ship sent two RHIBs to recover the cargo while Brandon went after the smugglers. The smugglers got away, but  of cocaine was recovered. Brandon and Edmonton returned to Esquimalt on 16 December.

Beginning in 2017, Brandon underwent a two-year refit at Esquimalt. The vessel returned to service in July 2019. From February to May 2021, Brandon and sister ship  deployed as part of Operation Caribbe, taking part in the interception of illicit drugs off the coasts of the Pacific coast of Mexico and Central America. In 2022, Brandon was one of the RCN vessels sent to take part in the multinational naval exercise RIMPAC 2022.

References

Notes

Citations

Sources

External links

 

Fleet of the Royal Canadian Navy
Kingston-class coastal defence vessels
1998 ships
Ships built in Nova Scotia